Christie Lynn Smith is an American actress best known for her role as Deardra Farnum in the 2010 film The Crazies.

Career
Smith grew up in the United States. Since 1991, she has guest starred in numerous television series including Beverly Hills, 90210, 7th Heaven, Charmed, Criminal Minds, Bones, Once and Again, Baywatch, JAG, CSI: Crime Scene Investigation, Malcolm in the Middle, House M.D., Grey’s Anatomy and ER. She also appeared recurringly in Undressed and General Hospital.

Her film credits include Gods and Generals (2003) and The Crazies (2010), as well as a number of short films. She also appeared in an episode of Threshold, titled "The Burning".

Personal life
Since 1998, Smith has been married to actor John Fortson. They have two children together, a daughter (Abby), born March 14, 2008 and a son born in December 2012.

Filmography

Film

Television

References

External links

20th-century American actresses
21st-century American actresses
Actresses from Florida
American film actresses
American television actresses
Living people
People from Orange Park, Florida
1969 births